Pearls to Pigs, Vol. 2 is an EP and the 5th release by American Electronic-Alternative Rock band Modwheelmood. It was released digitally only on February 26, 2008. This is a second of a series of releases, the release date of the next EP is June 2008. The track names make reference to each other - Track 2 is "Sunday Morning", while Track 4, Domenica Pomeriggio, is Italian for "Sunday Afternoon".

Track listing

Crumble - 04:07
Sunday Morning - 03:30
If I Was You - 04:03
Domenica Pomeriggio - 01:08
Scene - 03:16

References

Modwheelmood EPs
2008 EPs